Lima District may refer to:

 Lima District, the downtown district of Lima, Peru
 Lima District, Paraguay, in the San Pedro Department
Lima District (Norfolk Southern), a rail line in the United States